The 2015 Guangzhou R&F season is the 5th year in Guangzhou R&F's existence and its 5th season in the Chinese football league, also its 4th season in the top flight.

Squad
As of 12 August 2015

Reserve squad

Out on loan

Coaching staff

Before July 22

July 22 to August 24

After August 24

Transfers

Winter

In:

Out:

Summer

In:

Out:

Competitions

Chinese Super League

Results summary

Results

Table

Chinese FA Cup

AFC Champions League

Qualifying play-off

Group stage

Squad statistics

Appearances and goals

|-
|colspan="14"|Players who away from the club on loan:

|-
|colspan="14"|Players who appeared for Shanghai Greenland Shenhua who left during the season:

|}

Goal scorers

Disciplinary Record

References

Chinese football clubs 2015 season
Guangzhou City F.C. seasons